Timna Brauer (born May 1, 1961 in Vienna, Austria) is an Austrian-Israeli singer-songwriter. She collaborates with the Israeli pianist Elias Meiri. They are the parents of daughter Jasmin and son Jonathan. She was born in Austria to  Austrian dad and Israeli born-mom. Her dad is Arik Brauer.

She represented Austria at the Eurovision Song Contest 1986, singing "Die Zeit ist einsam".

Brauer participated in the third season of the Austrian television dance competition Dancing Stars in 2007, coming in tenth place.

Select Discography 
 1987: Orient (Timna Brauer & Elias Meiri Ensemble)
 1992: Mozart "Anders" (Timna Brauer & Elias Meiri Ensemble)
 1996: Tefila-Prayer / Jewish Spirituals (Timna Brauer)
 1997: Chansons et violons (Timna Brauer & Elias Meiri)
 1999: Die Brauers (The Brauer family - 3 generations)
 2001: Songs from Evita (Timna Brauer)
 2001: Voices for Peace (Timna Brauer & various choirs)
 2005: Kinderlieder aus Europa: CD + Informational booklet (Timna Brauer & Elias Meiri Ensemble + Children)
 2006: Der kleine Mozart: Listen and Play CD for Children (Timna Brauer & Elias Meiri Ensemble)

Bibliography 
 Timna Brauer & Birgit Antoni, Wir singen in vielen Sprachen. Annette Betz, Vienna, 2005. 
 Timna Brauer & Elias Meiri, World Music Israel. Theodore Presser, King of Prussia, no date. ISBN B00008H6H4

External links 

 Official website of Timna Brauer and Elias Meiri (German/English)
 Interview with Timna Brauer at religion.at

1961 births
Living people
Eurovision Song Contest entrants for Austria
Austrian emigrants to Israel
20th-century Austrian women singers
Austrian Jews
Austrian people of Israeli descent
Eurovision Song Contest entrants of 1986
Musicians from Vienna
Jewish jazz musicians
21st-century Austrian women singers